Rejuvenation Research is a bimonthly peer-reviewed scientific journal published by Mary Ann Liebert that covers research on rejuvenation and biogerontology. The journal was established in 1998. The current acting editor-in-chief is Ben Zealley. It is the official journal of the European Society of Preventive, Regenerative and Anti-Aging Medicine as well as PYRAMED: World Federation and World Institute of Preventive & Regenerative Medicine.

The journal exhibited unusual levels of self-citation and its journal impact factor of 2019 was suspended from Journal Citation Reports in 2020, a sanction which hit 33 journals in total. However, the journal's 2020 impact factor was made available again in June 2021.

History
The journal was established in 1998 as the Journal of Anti-Aging Medicine with Michael Fossel (Michigan State University) as editor-in-chief. It obtained its current title in 2004, when Aubrey de Grey took over as editor-in-chief. The current acting editor-in-chief is Ben Zealley.

SENS conferences
The journal publishes the abstracts of the biennial conferences of the SENS Research Foundation.

Abstracting and indexing
Rejuvenation Research is abstracted and indexed in:
MEDLINE
Current Contents/Clinical Medicine
Science Citation Index Expanded
EMBASE/Excerpta Medica
Scopus
CAB Abstracts

See also
Strategies for engineered negligible senescence
Timeline of senescence research

References

External links

Gerontology journals
Life extension
Mary Ann Liebert academic journals
Bimonthly journals
Publications established in 1998
English-language journals